Acacia cuspidifolia, commonly known as wait-a-while or bohemia, is a tree in the family Fabaceae.  Endemic to Western Australia, it occurs on the floodplains east of Carnarvon.

Wait-a-while grows to a height of about eight metres.  It usually has many main stems, with foliage  down to ground level.  Like most Acacia species, it has phyllodes rather than true leaves.  These are green, three to seven centimetres long, and two to five millimetres wide.  They terminate in a spine about two millimetres long.  Hooked spines up to five millimetres long also occur in the axils of leaves and stems.  The flowers are pale yellow, and held in spherical clusters about five millimetres in diameter.  The pods are light brown and flat, five to nine centimetres long and one to two centimetres wide.

Wait-a-while provides good forage for cattle and sheep, and the foliage persists in times of drought.  The spines tear at the wool of sheep, however, and have been known to trap weak sheep.  The common name "wait-a-while" refers to this.

See also
List of Acacia species

References

 
 
 

Acacias of Western Australia
cuspidifolia
Fabales of Australia
Taxa named by Bruce Maslin